Joseph Shen Bin (born 1970) (also written Giuseppe Shen Bin) is a bishop of the Roman Catholic Diocese of Haimen and , he is vice-president of Chinese Patriotic Catholic Association, created by PRC's State Administration for Religious Affairs as a government-sanctioned religious group. He was ordained "with both government recognition and papal mandate" on April 21, 2010; his predecessor, Matthew Yu Chengcai, was not recognized by the Holy See.

References

Further reading

External links

Living people
1970 births
21st-century Roman Catholic bishops in China
People from Qidong, Jiangsu